Eleutharrhena is a genus of flowering plants belonging to the family Menispermaceae.

Its native range is Assam to Southern Central China.

Species:
 Eleutharrhena macrocarpa (Diels) Ecrman

References

Menispermaceae
Menispermaceae genera